Achille Pinelli (1809 – 5 September 1841) was an Italian painter. Born in Rome, he was the son of the painter Bartolomeo Pinelli and his wife Mariangela Gatti.

Pinelli has left about two hundred watercolors painted between 1826 and 1835, preserved in the Museo di Roma, representing the facades of many churches in Rome. Liliana Barroero and Daniela Gallavotti Cavallero describe the paintings as "remaining useful iconographic documents for edifices that have been lost or since modified, and a frank description of the daily habits of Rome in the first decades of the nineteenth century: processions of sacconi, sentenced to death; street vendors; monks; nuns; police; civilians; children's games; beggars—all animate a lively and populous city".

Notes and references
Notes

References

External links

1809 births
1841 deaths
19th-century Italian painters
Italian male painters
Italian vedutisti
Painters from Rome
19th-century Italian male artists